Seven Guitars is a 1995 play by American playwright August Wilson. It focuses on seven African-American characters in the year 1948. The play begins and ends after the funeral of one of the main characters, showing events leading to the funeral in flashbacks. Seven Guitars represents the 1940s entry in Wilson's Pittsburgh Cycle, a decade-by-decade anthology of African-American life in Pittsburgh, Pennsylvania during the twentieth century; Wilson would revisit the stories of some of these characters in King Hedley II, set in the 1980s.

Plot synopsis
Just released from 90 days in jail, Blues singer Floyd "Schoolboy" Barton is asked to sign a record deal after a song he recorded months before becomes an unexpected hit. After a year of trials and tribulations, Floyd is ready to right the past year's wrongs and return to Chicago with a new understanding of what's important in his life. Unfortunately his means of righting wrongs are inherently flawed.

The play's recurring theme is the African-American male's fight for his own humanity, self-understanding and self-acceptance in the face of personal and societal ills. The rooster is a recurring symbol of black manhood throughout the play, and provides a violent and shocking foreshadowing effect when Hedley delivers a fiery monologue and ritualistically slaughters one in front of the other characters.

Awards and nominations 
Awards
 1996 New York Drama Critics' Circle Award for Best Play
Nominations
 1995 Pulitzer Prize for Drama
 1996 Drama Desk Award for Best Play
 1996 Tony Award for Best Play

References

External links
 

1995 plays
All-Black cast Broadway shows
Broadway plays
New York Drama Critics' Circle Award winners
The Pittsburgh Cycle
Plays set in the 1940s
African-American plays
Tony Award-winning plays